Jean-Pierre Miquel (22 January 1937 – 22 February 2003) was a French actor and theatre director, as well as an administrator of the Comédie française.

Biography 
Artistic director at the Théâtre de l'Odéon from 1971 to 1977, he becomes managing director of the Conservatoire national supérieur d'art dramatique from 1982 to 1993 and administrator of the Comédie française.
from 1993 to 2001.

In 1985, as director of the Conservatoire national supérieur d'art dramatique de Paris, he organised a great exhibition of paintings by Dolores Puthod devoted to the Commedia dell'Arte and wrote articles published in the "Catalogo generale delle Opere di Dolores Puthod".

Actor 
 1965: El Greco by Luc Vilsen, directed by Georges Vitaly, Théâtre du Vieux-Colombier 
 1975: Suréna de Corneille, directed by Jean-Pierre Miquel, Théâtre de l’Odéon 
 1980: La Malédiction after Seven Against Thebes by Aeschylus, The Phoenician Women by Euripides and Antigone by Sophocles, directed by Jean-Pierre Miquel, Festival d'Avignon
 1982: Night and Day de Tom Stoppard, directed by Jacques Rosner, Maison de la Culture André Malraux Reims, Nouveau théâtre de Nice

Theatre director 
{{Columns-list|colwidth=30em|rules=yes|
 1964: Suréna by Pierre Corneille, Théâtre Récamier
 1965: Cinna by Pierre Corneille, Théâtre Récamier
 1965: Oreste by Vittorio Alfieri, Arras puis Théâtre Récamier
 1966: Le Cid by Pierre Corneille, Théâtre Antoine
 1967: Horace by Pierre Corneille, Théâtre des Variétés
 1967: La Butte de Satory by Pierre Halet, Théâtre de Chaillot, reprise Théâtre Récamier
 1968: Renaud et Armide by Jean Cocteau, Amiens
 1969: Spectacle des auteurs contemporains 5 pièces en un acte réunissant : Pierre Halet, Guy Foissy, Rixe de Jean-Claude Grumberg, Victor Haïm, Fernando Arrabal, Maison de la Culture d'Amiens
 1969: L'Étoile de Séville by Félix Lope de Vega, Festival de Théâtre baroque de Montauban 
 1969: La Malédiction (1st version), montage of texts by Aeschylus, Sophocles, Euripides, Paris and provinces
 1970: Antigone by Bertolt Brecht, Amiens
 1975: Dom Juan by Molière with le Jeune Théâtre National, provinces
 1980: La Malédiction after Seven Against Thebes by Aeschylus, The Phoenician Women by Euripides and Antigone by Sophocles, Festival d'Avignon
 1981: Les Vacances by Jean-Claude Grumberg, Centre dramatique de Reims
 1983: Le Roi Victor by Louis Calaferte
 1984: La double inconstance by Marivaux, Conservatoire national d'art dramatique and tour in the USA  
 1984: Le Fauteuil à bascule by Jean-Claude Brisville, maison de la Culture de Loire-Atlantique Nantes   
 1985: La Bataille de Waterloo by Louis Calaferte, Studio des Champs-Elysées
 1985: The Collection by Harold Pinter, centre dramatique national de Reims
 1988: Les Sincères by Marivaux, Rencontres d'été de la Chartreuse de Villeneuve-lès-Avignon (students of the Conservatoire National Supérieur d’Art Dramatique)  
 1989: Le Souper by Jean-Claude Brisville, Théâtre Montparnasse
 1990: L’Officier de la garde by Ferenc Molnár, Comédie des Champs-Élysées
 1991: L'Antichambre by Jean-Claude Brisville, Théâtre de l'Atelier
}}

Théâtre de l’Odéon

Comédie-Française

 Filmography 

 Cinema 
1969: Z (by Costa-Gavras) - Pierre - un avocat
1972: L'Étrangleur (by Paul Vecchiali) - Le commissaire principal
1975: Section spéciale( by Costa-Gavras) - Alec Mellor, l'avocat d'Émile Bastard
1982: All Fired Up (by Jean-Paul Rappeneau)  - Le ministère de l'Économie et des finances
1985: Bras de fer (by Gérard Vergez) - (voice)
1990: Tatie Danielle (by Étienne Chatiliez) - Doctor
1990: Lacenaire (by Francis Girod) - Le président du tribunal
1992: Max et Jérémie (by Claire Devers) - Maubuisson
1993: Hélas pour moi (by Jean-Luc Godard) - L'autre pasteur
1998: Terminale (by Francis Girod) - Le Proviseur (final film role)

 Television 
1984: Raison perdue (by Michel Favart) - Charles Mornant
1989: L'Ingénieur aimait trop les chiffres (by Michel Favart) - Aubertet
1995: Les Alsaciens ou les Deux Mathilde (by Michel Favart) - Baron Kempf
1997: Un homme digne de confiance'' (de Philippe Monnier) - Le procureur

References

External links 
 

1937 births
2003 deaths
People from Neuilly-sur-Seine
French male stage actors
French male film actors
French male television actors
French theatre directors
French theatre managers and producers
Administrators of the Comédie-Française
Deaths from cancer in France